Hertsmere is a constituency in Hertfordshire, England, represented in the House of Commons since 2015 by Oliver Dowden.

Constituency profile 
Just beyond the North-Western boundary of Greater London and with fast railway links into the capital, Hertsmere is a Parliamentary constituency in the Home Counties. The constituency is in the London Commuter Belt, largely inside London's orbital motorway  the M25 and within the London  green belt, in the South-West of Hertfordshire. Political consultancy Electoral Calculus classifies the constituency's population as broadly Conservative 'kind yuppies'. Hertsmere has the third highest Jewish population of any UK Parliamentary constituency.

According to the census for England and Wales, the population of the  Hertsmere local authority area (which presently corresponds to the area of the Parliamentary constituency) has increased by 7.8%, from around 100,000 in 2011 to 107,800 in 2021. This is higher than the overall increase for England (6.6%), where the population grew by nearly 3.5 million to 56,489,800, but slightly lower than the increase for the East of England region that Hertsmere belongs to (8.3%). The fastest growing age group in Hertsmere is the over-65s, which has increased since 2011 by 17.6%, close to the overall rate of growth for this age group in England (20.1%).

Parts of the constituency are among the most prosperous in Britain but 2015 data from the English Multiple deprivation index for the Borough of Hertsmere shows widely varying levels of deprivation, with overall deprivation levels - on a scale from 1 (the most deprived) to 32,844 (the least deprived) - ranging from 3,049 for Borehamwood Cowley Hill, the most deprived area in Hertfordshire and in the top 10% most deprived nationally, to 32,695 for Bushey Heath, in the top 1% least deprived.

The constituency of Hertsmere has returned a  Conservative Member of Parliament at every general election since its creation and has been a safe seat almost throughout, with majorities ranging from 3,075 in  1997 (the election in which Labour won 418 Parliamentary seats, the largest number ever held by a single party) to 21,313 in  2019 (when the Conservative Party won 317 seats and a Parliamentary majority of 85). A close result for second place occurred in  2010, with only 661 votes separating the Labour Party and Liberal Democrat candidates.

In the history of the constituency the  Liberal Democrat vote share has fallen substantially, from a quarter of the vote and second place ahead of Labour in 1983 to less than half that and third place in 2019. In  2015 the party fell to fourth place.

The other parties represented in the constituency since it was created are the UK Independence Party (UKIP), whose vote peaked at 6,383 in  2015,  The Green Party (1,653 in  2019), the British National Party (1,397 in  2010), the Referendum Party (1,703 in  1997),  Socialist Labour Party (518 in  2005) and the Natural Law Party (191 in  1997). In  1983, Ronald Parkinson, who stood as an Independent  Communist, polled 1,116 votes.

Boundaries and composition

1983–1997: The Borough of Hertsmere, and the City of St Albans ward of London Colney.

The New County Constituency was formed largely from the bulk of the abolished County Constituency of South Hertfordshire.  Also included is the area comprising the former Urban District of Bushey, transferred from South West Hertfordshire.

1997–present: The Borough of Hertsmere.

Since 1997 the constituency is coterminous with the borough of Hertsmere, in southern Hertfordshire (before then it had also included the City of St Albans ward of London Colney, which was transferred to the St Albans constituency). Hertsmere consists of the major towns and villages of Bushey, Radlett, Potters Bar and Borehamwood, elevated settlements above the headwaters of the River Colne which forms much of the northern border. Bushey borders Watford and the London Borough of Harrow to the west and south west, while Potters Bar borders Barnet and Broxbourne on the east. Borehamwood is just south-east of the centre, the largest town in the constituency — in the north and centre is Radlett, separated by two large villages and farms from St Albans to the north.

Following their review of parliamentary representation in Hertfordshire, the Boundary Commission recommended no changes to constituency boundaries for the 2010 general election. The seat has electoral wards:

Aldenham East, Aldenham West, Borehamwood Brookmeadow, Borehamwood Cowley Hill, Borehamwood Hillside, Borehamwood Kenilworth, Bushey Heath, Bushey North, Bushey Park, Bushey St James, Elstree, Potters Bar Furzefield, Potters Bar Oakmere, Potters Bar Parkfield, Shenley.

In 2021 the  Boundary Commission for England, as part of the 2023 Periodic Review of Westminster constituencies, published draft changes to constituency boundaries which are planned to come into force in 2023. To bring the population of the constituency within 5% of the new ‘electoral quota’ of 73,393, the commission proposed that the borough ward of Bushey North, currently in the Hertsmere constituency, join the  Watford constituency and the Welwyn Hatfield borough ward of Northaw and Cuffley, which is currently included in the  Broxbourne constituency, join Hertsmere. The effect will be to reduce the population of the constituency by approximately 7%: the new Hertsmere constituency is predicted to contain an electorate of approximately 73,133. On 8 November 2022, the final draft of the Boundary Commission's proposals was published, following consultation. The new Hertsmere CC (County Constituency) is as proposed in the previous draft.

Members of Parliament
This safe Conservative constituency was created in 1983 from the former seat of South Hertfordshire. Cecil Parkinson, who had entered Parliament in 1970 and had previously represented South Hertfordshire, was MP from the seat's creation until his retirement in 1992. Parkinson was a close ally of Prime Minister Margaret Thatcher and had run her successful  1983 election campaign. Parkinson stepped down on the day of Margaret Thatcher's resignation as Conservative party leader.  

James Clappison held the seat for five electoral terms, from 1992 until his decision to stand down from parliament at the 2015 general election.

The seat was subsequently won by Oliver Dowden.

Elections

Elections in the 2010s

Elections in the 2000s

Elections in the 1990s

Elections in the 1980s

See also
 List of parliamentary constituencies in Hertfordshire

Notes

References

Parliamentary constituencies in Hertfordshire
Politics of Hertsmere
Constituencies of the Parliament of the United Kingdom established in 1983